Guerrilla War, released in Japan as , is an overhead run and gun video game produced by SNK. Originally released for arcades in 1987 as a coin-operated arcade game, Guerrilla War was ported to Amstrad CPC, Apple II, Commodore 64, Nintendo Entertainment System, PlayStation Network, and ZX Spectrum.

Plot
Guerrilla War followed the adventures of two unnamed rebel commandos (Che Guevara and Fidel Castro in the Japanese version) as they raid an unnamed Caribbean Island in order to free it from the rule of an unnamed tyrannical dictator. Along the way the players vanquish hordes of enemy soldiers while attempting to rescue hostages (with large score reductions for any hostages killed in the crossfire), collecting weapons from troopers and operating tanks.

Releases

The arcade version, released by SNK in 1987, followed the format of Ikari Warriors (1986). Using eight-way rotary joysticks, the game allowed players to move their character in one direction while rotating the joystick in order to shoot in another.

The game was moderately successful, and spawned ports onto home video game systems. Data East released home editions on the PC, Commodore 64 and Apple II, while Imagine Software published the Amstrad CPC  and ZX Spectrum ports in Europe. SNK published itself a version for the NES/Famicom 8-bit console. Because of the limits of the home platforms, the home versions did not have the rotating joysticks. Both the arcade and home console versions were included on the SNK 40th Anniversary Collection for Nintendo Switch, PlayStation 4, and Xbox One.

The NES version's two-player simultaneous play, unlimited continues, and frantic action gave it an edge over its arcade predecessor. It received a perfect 5-star rating in the book Ultimate Nintendo: Guide to the NES Library 1985–1995 and is also available on PlayStation Network. This version featured Box cover art by Marc Ericksen, who was also responsible for the cover illustration for SNK's own Ikari Warriors III: The Rescue and P.O.W.

Che Guevara connection
As the original title indicates, the game is based on the exploits of revolutionary Che Guevara, and the defeat of the Batista regime in Cuba in the late 1950s. In addition, player 2's character was Fidel Castro. Castro as he appears in this game is ranked fifth in Electronic Gaming Monthly’s list of the top ten video game politicians. Nevertheless, fearing anti-Communist sentiments in the West, SNK did a localisation of the game's dialogue and instruction manual for its North American and European releases. The version of Guevara released for the Japanese Famicom is a sought-after item for many video game collectors.

Reception 
In Japan, Game Machine listed Guerrilla War on their January 15, 1988 issue as being the ninth most-successful table arcade unit of the month.

References

External links

Guerrilla War at Neo-Geo.com (review) 1
C64 Guerrilla War

1987 video games
Amstrad CPC games
Apple II games
Arcade video games
Cold War video games
Commodore 64 games
Cooperative video games
Cultural depictions of Che Guevara
Cultural depictions of Fidel Castro
Data East video games
Hamster Corporation games
Head-to-head arcade video games
Multiplayer and single-player video games
Nintendo Entertainment System games
Nintendo Switch games
PlayStation 4 games
PlayStation Network games
Quicksilver Software games
Run and gun games
SNK games
SNK Playmore games
Video games based on real people
Video games developed in Japan
Video games set in Cuba
Works about Che Guevara
ZX Spectrum games